Incident of the 7th Bamboo Flute (Korean alternate title: Chilbeontong sosageon) is a 1936 Korean film directed by and starring Na Woon-gyu. It premiered at the WooMiKwan theater.

Plot
This action-oriented film tells the story of a traveling theatrical troupe. When one of the actresses is sold to criminals running an opium den, Na Woon-gyu's character rescues her and returns her to the troupe.

References

External links

See also
 Korea under Japanese rule
 List of Korean-language films
 Cinema of Korea

1936 films
Pre-1948 Korean films
Korean black-and-white films
Films directed by Na Woon-gyu